The 1969 World Shotgun Championships were separate ISSF World Shooting Championships for the trap and skeet events held in San Sebastián, Spain.

Medal count

Men

Women

See also
1969 World Running Target Championships

References

ISSF World Shooting Championships
Shooting
S
1969 in shooting sports
Sport in San Sebastián
Shooting competitions in Spain